Liracraea dictyota is an extinct species of sea snail, a marine gastropod mollusk in the family Mangeliidae.

Description

Distribution
This extinct species is endemic to New Zealand and fossils were found off Stewart Island.

References

 Powell, Arthur William Baden. "The Mollusca of Stewart Island." Records of the Auckland Institute and Museum 2.4 (1939): 211–238.
 Maxwell, P.A. (2009). Cenozoic Mollusca. pp 232–254 in Gordon, D.P. (ed.) New Zealand inventory of biodiversity. Volume one. Kingdom Animalia: Radiata, Lophotrochozoa, Deuterostomia. Canterbury University Press, Christchurch.

External links

dictyota
Gastropods described in 1885
Gastropods of New Zealand